{{DISPLAYTITLE:C3H3NO2}}
The molecular formula C3H3NO2 may refer to:

 Cyanoacetic acid, an organic compound; a white, hygroscopic solid
 Methyl cyanoformate, an organic compound
 Münchnone, a mesoionic compound
 Oxazolone, a chemical compound and functional group